Frank Peter Balistrieri (May 27, 1918 – February 7, 1993) was the crime boss of the Milwaukee crime family from 1961 to 1993. He was a central figure in the skimming of Las Vegas casinos during the 1970s and 1980s, and served several prison sentences.

Criminal career
In the late 1950s, Balistrieri married Antonina Alioto, a fellow Sicilian, and daughter of Milwaukee crime family boss John Alioto. They had four children together. In 1961, Balistrieri was installed as the new boss of the Milwaukee family, replacing the retired Alioto.

According to the FBI records, in 1961, Balistrieri entered a feud with Chicago mob boss Tony Accardo, due to Balistrieri allegedly ordering the murder of nightclub operator Izzy Pogrob the year prior without Accardo's permission.

According to FBI records, Balistrieri oversaw gambling operations in Wisconsin, and in 1963 met with syndicate members in Chicago and made a deal that gave him control of the illegal bookmaking operations in Northern Illinois.

In 1971, Balistrieri was convicted of tax evasion and was sentenced to two years in prison, in Minnesota.

Balistrieri's legitimate businesses included promoting boxing fights, distributing coin operated devices, and owning bars, restaurants and strip tease operations, including "The Scene".

In May 1974, Balistrieri met with Kansas City boss Nicholas Civella in Las Vegas, Nevada. Balistrieri also met businessman Allen Glick. Glick had recently bought the Stardust and Fremont casinos with a $62.75 million loan from the Teamsters, and had given Frank Rosenthal the job of running the casinos at the insistence of Balistrieri, who had arranged the loan for Glick.

In 1977, the FBI initiated a sting operation in Milwaukee aimed at Balistrieri. They sent Special Agent Joseph Pistone, working undercover in New York City as "Donnie Brasco", to Milwaukee to help set up a vending machine company. In 1978, the FBI named Balistrieri in a news release as a "crime leader" in Milwaukee.

Soon Balistrieri and Civella entered a feud over each other's share from the casino skimming operations, and the two requested arbitration from The Outfit. The results of the arrangement, as ruled by Outfit leader Joseph Aiuppa and underboss Jackie Cerone, demanded that The Outfit receive a 25 percent tax as its cut in skimming operations. Balistrieri blamed Rosenthal, the Outfit representative at the Stardust Hotel, for Balistrieri's problems in Las Vegas. In 1982, Rosenthal narrowly averted death in a Las Vegas car bombing that was attributed to Balistrieri.

Prison
On October 9, 1983, Balistrieri was convicted of five gambling and tax charges related to a sports betting ring that grossed at least $2,000 a day from 1977 to 1980. The investigation had included wiretapping of the Shorecrest Hotel, owned by Balistrieri's son, Joseph, and a raid on Balistrieri's house in which FBI agents knocked the front door down with a sledgehammer. On April 11, 1984, Balistrieri and his sons were convicted of attempted extortion of a vending machine business. On May 29, 1984, Balistrieri was sentenced in Milwaukee to 13 years in prison and fined $30,000. In June 1984, his sons were sentenced to eight years in prison, but the term was reduced to five years; each son, who were lawyers, had their law licenses suspended and later disbarred.

In September 1985, Balistrieri was tried in Kansas City with eight other people for skimming an estimated $2 million of the gross income of the Argent Corporation casino operations. On January 1, 1986, Balistrieri pleaded guilty to one count of conspiracy and one count of racketeering, and was sentenced to 10 years in prison and fined $20,000, with this sentence to run concurrently with his 13-year sentence from 1984.

Health and death
On November 5, 1991, Balistrieri was released early from prison due to poor health. In December 1992, Balistrieri was admitted to St. Mary's Hospital (now Columbia St. Mary's) in Milwaukee, reportedly for colon surgery. Balistrieri died at the age of 74, on February 7, 1993, in Milwaukee.

References

Further reading
Kelly, Robert J. Encyclopedia of Organized Crime in the United States. Westport, Connecticut: Greenwood Press, 2000. 
Sifakis, Carl. The Mafia Encyclopedia. New York: Da Capo Press, 2005. 
Capeci, Jerry. The Complete Idiot's Guide to the Mafia. Indianapolis: Alpha Books, 2002. 
Neff, James. Mobbed Up: Jackie Presser's High-Wire Life in the Teamsters, the Mafia, and the FBI. New York: Atlantic Monthly Press, 1989.
Schmitt, Gavin. Milwaukee Mafia. Arcadia, 2012. 
Schmitt, Gavin. The Milwaukee Mafia: Mobsters in the Heartland. Barricade Books, 2015. 
Turner, William W. Hoover's FBI. New York: Thunder's Mouth Press, 1993.
United States. Congress. Senate. Committee on Governmental Affairs. Permanent Subcommittee on Investigations. Organized Crime: 25 Years After Valachi - Hearings Before the Permanent Subcommittee on Investigations. 1988. Organized Crime: 25 Years After Valachi : Hearings Before the Permanent Subcommittee on Investigations of the Committee on Governmental Affairs, United States Senate, One Hundredth Congress, Second Session, April 11, 15, 21, 22, 29, 1988

External links
Committee on the Judiciary Subcommittee on Crime, testimony from undercover federal agent Clark B. Hall
United States District Court for the Eastern District of Wisconsin: Searches Conducted on March 8, 1980
New York Times: Crime Figure Is Convicted
Milwaukee Mafia

1918 births
1993 deaths
American gangsters of Sicilian descent
American crime bosses
Crime in Milwaukee
American people convicted of tax crimes
People convicted of racketeering
People from Milwaukee